Cristian Westemaier Ribera (born 13 November 2002) is a Brazilian para cross-country skier. At the 2021 World Para Snow Sports Championships, he won the silver medal in the men's sprint sitting event.

Background
Ribera was born with arthrogryposis multiplex congenita, which causes bent and stiff joints in various parts of the body. He has undergone 21 leg surgeries to improve his condition. He started playing sports when he was four years old, and he started parallel skiing in 2015.

Career
Ribera made his international debut in the World Cup in 2017–18, and came in seventh place in the class for sitting athletes. He participated in the 2018 Winter Paralympics, finishing in sixth place in the 15 km event, ninth place and 15th place in the 7.5 km and sprint events respectively. In addition, he participated in the mixed relay, where Brazil finished in 13th place.

He came in 13th place in the World Cup in 2018–19, and he came in second place in the World Cup in 2019–20, only beaten by Ivan Golubkov. The following season, he finished in 13th place in the World Cup in 2020–21.

At the 2021 World Para Snow Sports Championships held in Lillehammer, Ribera won the silver medal there in second place in the sprint event. In the 18 km event, he finished in sixth place, and in the 10 km event, he finished in eighth place.

References

External links
 

2002 births
Living people
Brazilian male cross-country skiers
Paralympic cross-country skiers of Brazil
Cross-country skiers at the 2018 Winter Paralympics
People with arthrogryposis
21st-century Brazilian people